Coryza is a genus of beetles in the family Carabidae, containing the following species:

 Coryza alberti Burgeon, 1935
 Coryza atriceps Burgeon, 1935
 Coryza beccarii Putzeys, 1873
 Coryza carinifrons (Reitter, 1900)
 Coryza gerardi Burgeon, 1935
 Coryza globithorax (Fairmaire, 1901)
 Coryza maculata (Nietner, 1856)
 Coryza raffrayi Chaudoir, 1876
 Coryza semirubra Andrewes, 1926
 Coryza tschitscherini Semenov & Znojko, 1927

References

Scaritinae